This article is the Electoral history of Brian Mulroney, the eighteenth Prime Minister of Canada.

A conservative, he served one term as Prime Minister (1984-1993).  He led the Progressive Conservative Party of Canada in two general elections, winning back to back majority governments (1984) and (1988).  He was the first Conservative prime minister to do so since Prime Minister Sir John A. Macdonald, in 1887 and 1891.

Mulroney defeated Joe Clark for the leadership of the Progressive Conservatives in 1983, and then defeated Prime Minister John Turner in the 1984 election.  Mulroney's majority in the House of Commons was the largest in Canadian history, passing the record set by John Diefenbaker in 1958.  He again led the Progressive Conservatives to the polls in the 1988 general election and was returned to power, but with a reduced majority.

Mulroney stood for election to the House of Commons three times, once in a by-election after he was elected party leader, and twice in general elections.  He was elected each time, with substantial majorities.

Mulroney announced his retirement from politics in 1993 and was succeeded as prime minister and leader of the Progressive Conservatives by Kim Campbell.

Summary 

Mulroney ranks seventh out of twenty-three prime ministers for time in office, serving one term of eight years, 281 days.

He was the fifth of eight prime ministers from Quebec, the others being Sir John Abbott, Sir Wilfrid Laurier, Louis St. Laurent, Pierre Trudeau, Jean Chrétien, Paul Martin and Justin Trudeau.

Mulroney was involved in politics from a young age, being active in the Progressive Conservative party while in university.  Although he did not run for office, he was well-established within the party. In 1976 he ran for the leadership, but came in third, behind Joe Clark and Claude Wagner.  However, Clark was defeated in the 1980 general election and triggered a leadership convention in 1983.  Mulroney again contested the leadership, and this time defeated Clark.

Entering the House of Commons by a by-election in 1983, Mulroney was the Leader of the Opposition until the general election of 1984.  He led the Progressive Conservatives to a landslide, winning 211 of the 282 seats, the largest seat total in Canadian history.  He again led the party in the 1988 general election and was returned to power, albeit with a reduced majority.

Mulroney stood for election to the House of Commons three times, once in a by-election and twice in general elections.  He was elected each time, with substantial majorities.  He served a total of 10 years, 1 month, 28 days in the Commons.

Early in 1993, Mulroney announced his retirement from politics.  He returned to the private practice of law.

In the subsequent general election in 1993, the Progressive Conservatives were almost wiped out, going from a majority government to two seats in the Commons.

Federal general elections: 1984 and 1988 

Mulroney led the Progressive Conservative Party in two general elections (1984) and (1988).  He won both, defeating John Turner each time.

Federal election, 1984 

In his first election as leader, Mulroney led the Progressive Conservatives to the largest majority (in seat numbers) in Canadian history.

1 Leader of the Opposition when election was called;  Prime Minister after election.
2 Prime Minister when election was called;  Leader of the Opposition after the election.
3 Table does not include parties which received votes but did not elect any members.

Federal election, 1988 

In his second general election as leader, Mulroney was returned to office, but with a reduced majority.

1 Prime Minister when election was called;  Prime Minister after election.
2 Leader of the Opposition when election was called;  Leader of the Opposition after the election.
3 Table does not include parties which received votes but did not elect any members.

Federal constituency elections:  1983 to 1988 

Mulroney stood for election to the House of Commons three times.  He was elected each time, with substantial majorities.

1983 Federal By-Election: Central Nova 

The incumbent, Elmer MacKay, resigned his seat on June 15, 1983, after Mulroney was elected party leader, to give Mulroney an opportunity to enter the House of Commons.

 Elected. 
1 Rounding error.

1984 Federal Election: Manicouagan 

In the 1984 general election, Mulroney stood for election in the riding of Manicouagan in Quebec.

 Elected. 
X Incumbent. 
1 Rounding error.

1988 Federal Election: Charlevoix 

In the 1988 general election, Mulroney stood for election in the Quebec riding of Charlevoix, which included his home town, Baie-Comeau.

 Elected. 
1 Rounding error.

Progressive Conservative Party Leadership Conventions:  1976 and 1983 

Mulroney ran in two Progressive Conservative leadership contests, in 1976 and 1983.  He was defeated in the 1976 convention by Joe Clark, who became party leader.  After Clark lost the 1980 general election, there was another leadership convention, in 1983.  This time, Mulroney won and became party leader.

1976 Leadership Convention 

When Robert Stanfield announced his resignation as party leader in 1976, Mulroney was one of a crowded field of candidates in the leadership convention.  Although he came in second on the first ballot, he ended in third place on the fourth ballot, behind Joe Clark, who won the leadership, and Claude Wagner, who came in second.

1 Rounding error.

1983 Leadership Convention 

Following a leadership review at the 1983 Progressive Conservative convention, Clark triggered a leadership convention, in which he stood for re-election.  Mulroney again entered the leadership race.  This time, he defeated Clark and succeeded him as party leader.

1 Rounding error.

See also 

 Electoral history of John Turner - Mulroney's predecessor as Prime Minister.
 Electoral history of Joe Clark - Mulroney's predecessor as leader of the Progressive Conservative Party.
 Electoral history of Kim Campbell - Mulroney's successor as leader of the Progressive Conservative Party and as Prime Minister.

References

External links 

 Library of Parliament:  History of Federal Ridings since 1867
 CPAC – 1976 Progressive Conservative Leadership Convention
 CPAC – 1983 Progressive Conservative Leadership Convention

Mulroney, Brian